Hoodoo is an unreleased studio album by John Fogerty. It was recorded in the late spring of 1976 and originally intended to be his third solo studio album.

History
After the John Fogerty solo album, Fogerty wasted no time in recording more material for a new album to be followed with a tour, which would be very low-key, with a small group of musicians. In April 1976, he released a new single, "You Got the Magic" backed with "Evil Thing", which peaked at number 87 on the Billboard Hot 100 and did not sell a great deal. Fogerty submitted Hoodoo to Asylum Records, which assigned it a catalogue number, 7E-1081. Shortly before shipment, however, Fogerty and Asylum's Joe Smith made a joint decision that the album did not merit release. After several unsuccessful attempts to improve the album's quality, Fogerty began a nine-year estrangement from the music industry. He has confirmed in interviews that he instructed Asylum to destroy the master tapes, but bootleg copies are widespread.

Record World said that "You Got the Magic" "features [Fogerty's] chunky guitar style prominently" and shows "that he has lost none of the magic that he possessed when he led CCR to the top."

Track listing
All songs by J. C. Fogerty, except as noted

"You Got the Magic" – 3:43
"Between the Lines" – 3:40
"Leave My Woman Alone" (Ray Charles) – 3:09
"Marchin' to Blarney" – 3:18
"Hoodoo Man" – 2:55
"Telephone" – 2:55
"Evil Thing" – 3:40
"Henrietta" (James "Jimmy Dee" Fore, Larry Hitzfeld) – 2:58
"On the Run" – 3:32

References
 Koers, Peter (1999). Rocking All Over the World, Germany, 1994. .

External links
 John Fogerty official site

Albums produced by John Fogerty
John Fogerty albums
Unreleased albums